Šindliar is a village and municipality in Prešov District in the Prešov Region of eastern Slovakia.

History
In historical records the village was first mentioned in 1331.

Geography

Population 
It has a population of 560 people (2020-12-31).

References

External links
http://www.statistics.sk/mosmis/eng/run.html

Villages and municipalities in Prešov District
Šariš